Intisar Abioto (born 1986) is an artist and storyteller currently living and working in Portland Oregon. Working within and between the forms of dance, photography, collaboration, prose, and poetry, Abioto explores the meaning of time, space, and belonging within the construction of who, where, and what composes the African diaspora. Abioto has travelled across North America, Europe, and Africa to tell stories of personal identity and collective belonging. Her work interprets the tradition of Africans who can fly into contemporary and local landscapes, highlighting the fluidity of migration across national and natural boundaries.

Early life and education
Born in Memphis, Tennessee, Abioto moved to Portland, Oregon as a young adult with her family. Herself and four sisters infused this new home base with the creativity intuitive to their home town community and upbringing. She completed undergraduate studies at Spelman College and Wesleyan University.

The Black Portlanders
In 2013 Abioto started The Black Portlanders, a tumblr blog that has since expanded from the digital platform into gallery installations. Originally the project began as a way to expand the stories of who belongs in Portland, while honoring the multiple displacements that have disproportionally affected African Americans in Portland from Vanport to contemporary urban reinvestment strategies. By capturing the full spectrum of identity and belonging within the urban landscape of Portland, the project offers a counter-narrative to press branding Portland as "the whitest city in America".

Herself a member of the African Diaspora, The Black Portlanders uses photography to tell stories of transnational migration of African peoples to Portland from a perspective that is at once personal and transcendent. In 2015, Abioto expanded the project to include rural experiences by partnering with the National Urban League Portland chapter to illustrate a reissue of the State of Black Oregon, a report documenting economic inequities faced by African American communities across the state with an emphasis on resulting migration shifts. This social justice tool kit was enhanced by Abioto's creative vision, which honors the history of migration from the Southern United States to the Pacific Northwest. The project includes multiple images of each person she photographs, allowing the complexity of each person's natural expressions to unfold from the lenses of camera, the artist's eye, and the viewer's retina.

Exhibitions
Abioto's work has been featured in galleries internationally such as Portland Art Museum, Portland State University's Littman Gallery, and University of Oregon's defunct Portland-based gallery White Box.

References

External links
impactmania "Intisar Abioto: Visual Voice" by Jody Turner

1986 births
Living people
Artists from Portland, Oregon
People from Memphis, Tennessee
Spelman College alumni
Wesleyan University alumni
African Americans in Oregon